William J. Saunderson (born ) is a former politician in Ontario, Canada. He was a Progressive Conservative member of the Legislative Assembly of Ontario from 1995 to 1999, and served as a cabinet minister in the government of Mike Harris.

Background
Saunderson was educated at the University of Trinity College in the University of Toronto, receiving a Bachelor of Arts degree and subsequently becoming a certified accountant. He continued his education as an adult, and received a PhD from the University of Ottawa in 1994. After graduation, he worked as an accountant with Clarkson and Gordon. He co-founded Spectre Investment Counsel Ltd. in 1971, and worked with the Ontario Pension Commission from 1972 to 1983. Saunderson also had financial ties to the cigarette industry, which became controversial after he entered political life.

Politics
Saunderson was active in political organization before running for office himself. He took part in fundraising activities for several municipal, provincial and federal campaigns for such figures as Brian Mulroney, Joe Clark, David Crombie and Art Eggleton, and was the financial comptroller for the Progressive Conservative Party of Canada's national election campaigns in 1984 and 1988.

He ran in the riding of Eglinton in the 1995 provincial election, and defeated Liberal incumbent Dianne Poole by about 4,500 votes.

On June 26, 1995, he was appointed as Minister of Economic Development, Trade and Tourism in the first cabinet of Mike Harris. In 1997, Saunderson announced that the government would be cutting its spending on Ontario's seven "centres of excellence" by 13%. In October 1997, Harris shuffled his cabinet and Saunderson was dropped from his cabinet post. Saunderson had indicated that he would not be running for re-election in the next campaign.  After leaving cabinet, he was named to chair the Ontario International Trade Corporation.

Cabinet positions

Later life
In 1999, he was appointed to the board of directors of the Toronto Symphony Orchestra.

In 2000, Saunderson and his wife established a research chair at the University of Toronto to facilitate studies in brain injuries. In 1988 their daughter had been injured in a bicycling accident after being hit by a car.

In 2006, he supported Jane Pitfield in her bid to become mayor of Toronto.

References

External links
 

1934 births
Living people
Members of the Executive Council of Ontario
Politicians from Toronto
Progressive Conservative Party of Ontario MPPs
Trinity College (Canada) alumni
University of Ottawa alumni
University of Toronto alumni